The Corni di Canzo (en: Canzo's Horns), (also known as Còrni o Curunghèj o Culunghèj in Canzés) are a group of mountains located in the Triangolo lariano (larian triangle), to the south of Lake Como. Administratively they belong to the province of Como.

Description
They are three peaks, from east to west, named after Canzo town, in fact central and western horns edge val Ravella valley and the territory of Canzo and Valbrona town. Only the third peak, the smallest, is in the territory of Valmadrera town.
Western horn is 1373 meters high, the central one 1368 meters and the eastern is only 1232 meters.

The two highest peaks are well visible in Brianza and look like horns.

SOIUSA classification 
According to the SOIUSA (International Standardized Mountain Subdivision of the Alps) the mountain can be classified in the following way:
 main part = Western Alps
 major sector = North Western Alps
 section = Lugano Prealps
 subsection = Prealpi Comasche
 supergroup = Catena del Triangolo Lariano
 group = Gruppo dei Corni di Canzo
 subgroup = Sottogruppo dei Corni di Canzo
 code = I/B-11.I-C.9.a

Mountain huts 
Not far from the mountain are available two mountain huts: Rifugio SEV (Società Escursionisti Valmadreresi), on the northern slopes of the central horn at 1,125 m, and Rifugio Terz'Alpe, located on the way from Canzo to the mountain.

Notes

Mountain ranges of Italy
Mountains of the Alps
Mountains of Lombardy
Lugano Prealps